Natalie Monica La Rose (born 11 July 1988) is a Surinamese–Dutch singer, songwriter and dancer. In 2013, she signed a recording contract with American rapper Flo Rida's International Music Group imprint and Republic Records.

Early life
La Rose was born on 11 July 1988 in Amsterdam, Netherlands. Her parents are of Surinamese ancestry. La Rose has a sister, with whom she would dance and sing during her childhood. She also has two older brothers, who are not dancers nor singers. La Rose graduated in 2008 at the Lucia Marthas Dance Academy in Amsterdam, where she had studied singing and dancing.<ref name="megaman
', playing the role Taylor Mckessie.

Career

2010–2011: Career beginnings
At the age of 20, La Rose moved to Los Angeles to become a singer and dancer. She explained: "I didn't feel like I was getting anywhere in the Netherlands. I'd always had this belief that America was the place to be for me."

In 2010, La Rose got her first opportunity when she signed a deal with Aaliyah's former label Blackground Records, while being distributed by Interscope Records, as part of a musical duo named Amsterdam with dancer Sigourney Korper, who debuted in the music video for label mate J. Lewis and Flo Rida's "Dancing for Me". However, she says of this situation: "The group didn't work out, and no music was released. It just wasn't the right time."

In 2011, La Rose appeared as the leading female dancer in Lloyd's "Dedication to My Ex (Miss That)". In the same year, while at an ESPY Awards after party, she went up to Flo Rida and told him that she was going to work with him one day. Impressed with La Rose's confidence, the multi-platinum international superstar invited her to the studio. Over the next two years, she performed with Flo around the world.

In 2013, La Rose officially signed a deal with his International Music Group (I.M.G.) label and Republic Records.

2015–present: Breakthrough with "Somebody" and later work
On 6 January 2015, she released her debut single, "Somebody". The song features Def Jam recording artist Jeremih. "Somebody" peaked at No. 2 on the Official UK Singles Chart, No. 10 on the US Billboard Hot 100 and No. 12 on the Australian ARIA Singles Chart. On 24 April 2015, it was announced that La Rose will accompany Debby Ryan and Bea Miller as opening acts for the summer leg of Fifth Harmony's Reflection Tour, which began on 15 July in Louisville, KY.
 On 2 June 2015, she released her second single, "Around the World" featuring 300 recording artist Fetty Wap and production by Max Martin.
The song was written by Marco Borrero, Ilya Salmanzadeh, Max Martin, Savan Kotecha, Rickard Goransson, Justin Franks and Willie Maxwell. An accompanying music video for "Around the World premiered on 24 July 2015.

In May 2022, La Rose released "Tables", her first single in seven years. The song was released under Global Sound Entertainment, indicating that La Rose was no longer signed to Republic Records.

Artistry

Influences 
La Rose cites Aaliyah, Beyoncé, Shakira, Selena, Janet Jackson, Mariah Carey, Michael Jackson, Jennifer Lopez, Musiq Soulchild, Stevie Wonder and Whitney Houston among her musical influences.

Discography

Singles

As lead artist

As featured artist

Music videos

Awards and nominations

Tours
Featured act
Fifth Harmony – Reflection: The Summer Tour (2015)

Notes

References

External links
 

1988 births
21st-century American singers
21st-century Dutch singers
21st-century Dutch women singers
American people of Surinamese descent
Dutch expatriates in the United States
Dutch female dancers
Dutch people of Surinamese descent
English-language singers from the Netherlands
Living people
Dutch singer-songwriters
Musicians from Amsterdam
Republic Records artists
Singers from Los Angeles